The Sixth Street Bridge is a four-span, wrought iron bridge that crosses the Grand River in Grand Rapids, Michigan. It is a Michigan State Historic Site and is listed on the National Register of Historic Places. Built in 1886, it is the longest and oldest metal truss bridge in Michigan.

History

The Sixth Street Bridge was designed and built in 1886 by the Ohio-based Massillon Bridge Company for $31,000. The westernmost truss was shortened in 1921 when a canal along the river bank was filled in.

The bridge faced demolition in 1975, but was saved through the efforts of concerned citizens. The following year, the bridge was designated a Michigan State Historic Site (MSHS), and listed on the National Register of Historic Places. An MSHS informational marker was erected in 1981. The bridge is also listed on MDOT's Historic Bridge Inventory.

In 2009, the bridge was briefly closed to film scenes of Caught in the Crossfire.

The bridge underwent significant renovation in 2012, funded with a $1.8 million federal grant and $472,000 from the Downtown Development Authority.

Design

Along each side is a  sidewalk with ornamental railings. The piers and abutments are masonry and built of local Grand River limestone. The Sixth Street Bridge is the longest and oldest metal truss bridge in Michigan.

See also
List of bridges on the National Register of Historic Places in Michigan
National Register of Historic Places listings in Kent County, Michigan
List of Michigan State Historic Sites in Kent County, Michigan

References

External links

Images of the bridge undergoing renovation with the roadway removed

Michigan State Historic Sites
Road bridges on the National Register of Historic Places in Michigan
Transportation in Grand Rapids, Michigan
National Register of Historic Places in Kent County, Michigan
Wrought iron bridges in the United States
Pratt truss bridges in the United States
Buildings and structures in Grand Rapids, Michigan
Transportation buildings and structures in Kent County, Michigan